Juan José Gurruchaga Vergara (born November 29, 1977, in Santiago) is a Chilean television actor.

Filmography

Telenovelas
 16 (2003, TVN) - Darío Carmona
 Bienvenida Realidad (2004) - Rodrigo
 Versus (2005, TVN) - Álvaro Cox
 17 (2005, TVN) - Darío Carmona
 Los Treinta (2005) - Benito Lorca
 Floribella (2006, TVN) - Gaspar Balmaceda
 Alguien te mira (2007, TVN) - Ángel Montalva
 Amor por accidente (2007, TVN) - Polo Rivera
  (2008), TVN) - Aida's Teacher
 ¿Dónde está Elisa? (2009, TVN) - Detective Esteban Briceño
 Vuelve temprano (2014, TVN)

TV shows
 Corre Video (2006), TVN - Host
 Los Improvisadores (2010–2011), Vía X - Host, actor
 Radar TV (2011), Vía X - Host
 Quiero Mi Fiesta (2011), Canal 13 - Host
 Mañaneros (2011-), La Red - Host
 Así Somos (2011-), La Red - Host

External links
Especial Fotográfico de Juan José Gurruchaga en TVN
 

1982 births
Chilean male film actors
Chilean male telenovela actors
Chilean male television actors
Chilean television presenters
Living people
Male actors from Santiago
Chilean people of Basque descent
Chilean television personalities